Reniece Boyce (born 3 September 1997) is a Trinidadian cricketer who plays for Trinidad and Tobago and Barbados Royals as a right-handed wicket-keeper batter.  In May 2017, she was named in the West Indies squad for the 2017 Women's Cricket World Cup.  She made her Women's One Day International (WODI) debut for the West Indies against South Africa in the 2017 Women's Cricket World Cup on 2 July 2017.

In October 2018, Cricket West Indies (CWI) awarded her a women's contract for the 2018–19 season. In June 2021, Boyce was named as the captain of the West Indies A Team for their series against Pakistan.

References

External links

1997 births
Living people
Trinidad and Tobago women cricketers
West Indies women One Day International cricketers
West Indies women Twenty20 International cricketers
West Indian women cricketers
Barbados Royals (WCPL) cricketers
Place of birth missing (living people)
Wicket-keepers